Jan Petter Wilhelm Courvoisier Sissener (born 14 March 1955) is a Norwegian businessperson.

Jan Petter Sissener was born in Geneva in 1955. Following his parents' divorce, he moved to Norway and adopted his mother's last name, Sissener. After attempting law school in Geneva, he studied at the Norwegian School of Management. Following his graduation there he started working for E. Vestnes as a money broker. In 1983, he became a partner in Gunnar, Bohn & Co, later known as Alfred Berg Norge.

In 1986 Sissener started working in Carnegie International in London, and in 1989 he moved back to Norway where he set up Carnegie's Norwegian branch. After turning Carnegie into one of Norway's greatest brokerages, he broke off in 1993 and established his own brokerage, Sirius Securities. Sirius became an immediate success and was acquired by Orkla Finans after only five months. Sissener lead Orkla Finans for the next seven years.

In 2001 he was again hired by Alfred Berg, this time as their Head of Nordic Equities. Alfred Berg became a great success under Sissener. Eventually, Sissener disagreed with the owner, ABN Amro and left Alfred Berg in 2005. He then joined Kaupthing as the CEO of their Norwegian activities whilst also being their Global Head of Equities. He left Kaupthing in February 2008 after an argument with the board. Kaupthing was, according to Starmine, amongst the best Nordic brokerages in 2008.

In 2009, Sissener purchased Saga Capital, a company with license to conduct discretionary Asset Management. Saga Capital was later changed to Sissener AS. In 2009, Sissener AS was established as an alternative to other investment firms. The company has 2 active funds, Sissener Energy (2010) and Sissener Sirius (2009). A third fund, Sissener Ucits, is being launched in 2012.

References

1955 births
Living people
Norwegian businesspeople
BI Norwegian Business School alumni
Businesspeople from Geneva
Swiss emigrants to Norway